The following outline is provided as an overview of and topical guide to guitars:

A guitar is a plucked string instrument, usually played with fingers or a pick. The guitar consists of a body with a rigid neck to which the strings, generally six in number, are attached. Most guitar necks have metal frets attached (the exception is fretless bass guitars). Guitars are traditionally constructed of various woods and strung with animal gut or, more recently, with either nylon or steel strings. Some modern 2010-era guitars are made of polycarbonate materials. Guitars are made and repaired by luthiers. There are two primary families of guitars: acoustic and electric. An acoustic guitar has a wooden top and a hollow body. An electric guitar may be a solid-body or hollow body instrument, which is made louder by using a pickup and plugging it into a guitar amplifier and speaker. Another type of guitar is the low-pitched bass guitar.

Instrument classification
A guitar can be described as all of the following:

Musical instrument
Chordophone
Rhythm section instrument

Types and varieties of guitars

Standard guitar variations
 Acoustic guitar
 Acoustic-electric guitar
 Archtop guitar
 Classical guitar
 Electric guitar
 Flamenco guitar
 Flat top guitar
 Fretless guitar
 Hybrid guitar
 Parlor guitar
 Resonator guitar
 Selmer guitar (Maccaferri)
 Semi-acoustic guitar
 Silent guitar
 Steel-string acoustic guitar
 Tailed bridge guitar

Pitch-based variations
Alto guitar
Baritone guitar
Bass guitars
Contrabass guitar
Acoustic bass guitar
Bass guitar
Niibori guitars
Octave guitar
Requinto
Soprano guitar
Tenor guitar
Terz guitar

Steel guitars
Lap steel guitar (aka Hawaiian guitar)
Pedal steel guitar

Courses
 Single course
 Double course (e.g., 12-string guitar)
 Triple course (e.g. Tiple Colombiano)
 Four or more strings per course (e.g. Guitarron Chileno)

Extra strings
Seven-string guitar – Russian guitar and electric guitar
Eight-string guitar
Nine-string guitar
Ten-string guitar
11-string guitar
Twelve-string guitar
13-string guitar
Extended-range bass – Covers bass guitars with 5 or more strings

Fewer strings
 Three-string guitar
 Four-string guitar
 Five-string guitar

Misc
 Harp guitar
 Gittler guitar
 Lyre-guitar
 Nano guitar
 Portuguese guitar
 Prepared guitar
 Vintage guitar

Models

6-strings

Acoustic guitar models
CF Martin & Company Dreadnought
Gibson J-45
Ovation Roundback

Semi-acoustic models
Gibson ES-335
Rickenbacker 360 (Both 12-string and 6-string models)
Gretsch White Falcon

Solid body electric models
Fender Stratocaster
Fender Telecaster
Gibson Les Paul
Gibson SG
Gibson Flying V
Superstrat
Steinberger

Bass guitars
Bass guitars are also called "electric basses".
Fender Jazz Bass
Fender Precision Bass
Violin Bass
Alembic Bass

Parts

 Body: The solid body of an electric and the hollow sound box of an acoustic
 Bridge
 Fingerboard (fretboard)
 Frets
 Wiring and electronics (including volume and tone controls)
 Headstock (peghead, head)
 Inlay
 Machine heads (tuners)
 Neck
 Neck joint: see Set-in neck, Bolt-on neck and Neck-thru
 Nut
 Pickguard
 Pickup (Electric – Single coil (including P-90), Humbucker) (Acoustic – Piezoelectric)
 Sound board (Acoustic)
 Strings
 Truss rod

Guitar accessories

Miscellaneous
Capo
Guitar pick
Fingerpick
Neck-thru-body
Slide
Vibrato systems for guitar ("Tremolo arm")
Electronic tuner
Patch cord (Electric, some acoustics)

Guitar amplifiers

Guitar amplifier
Distortion (guitar)
Power attenuator (guitar)
Preamplifier
Stack: A guitar amplification setup consisting of one or more speaker cabinets and a "head" (amplifier), rather than a self-contained unit.

Guitar effects

Effects unit (also known as "Stomp Box")
Compression (electric guitar)
Chorus effect
Delay (audio effect)
Fuzz (electric guitar)
Flange (electric guitar)
Phaser (electric guitar)
Reverb (Reverberation)
Sustain
Infinite guitar
Ebow
Overdrive/distortion terms
Brown sound
Crunch
Gain
Distortion (guitar)
Overdrive (music)
Clean/Dirty
Wah-wah pedal

Guitar software
Guitar Pro
G7 (guitar software)
Power Tab
RiffWorks Guitar recording and online collaboration software. Free version.
TuxGuitar Guitar free software.
Games
Guitar Freaks An arcade game featuring playing guitars
Guitar Hero Like Guitar Freaks, except for home use
Frets on Fire A cross-platform Guitar Hero clone licensed under GNU GPL.
Rockband A multi-platform game for PlayStation 2, 3, Xbox 360, and Nintendo Wii which includes a guitar element similar to that of Guitar Hero/Freaks along with a Karaoke-like vocal element and a drum element.

Guitar use

Guitar music
Concerto Suite for Electric Guitar and Orchestra
Classical guitar music
Instrumental guitar
Tablature notation ("Tab")

Guitar tunings
See Guitar tunings and List of guitar tunings.
Standard tuning
Alternate tunings
Drop tunings
Open tuning
New standard tuning
Regular tuning
Major thirds tuning
All fourths tuning
All fifths tuning
Repetitive tuning
English guitar
Russian guitar

Guitar playing styles
The difference between guitar playing styles and guitar techniques (below) is that a style is a collection of techniques
3rd bridge
Classical guitar techniques
Downstrokes picking
Extended technique
Flamenco
Guitar solo
Guitar showmanship
Jazz guitar
Lead guitar
Prepared guitar
Rhythm guitar
Shred guitar
Slack-key guitar
Slide guitar

Guitar technique
Main Category: :Category:Guitar performance techniques

Fretting hand technique
Dampening
Hammer-on
Pull-off
Guitar chord
Barre chord
String skipping

Bridge (Right) hand techniques
See also the following from List of musical terminology: sul porticello (plucking/strumming near the bridge), sul tasto (plucking/strumming above the fingerboard)
Tapping
Palm mute (known as pizzicato in Classical guitar terminology)

Strumming 
Rasgueado
Strum

Flat picking (single picking, plectrum picking)
Guitar picking
Alternate picking
Sweep picking
Economy picking
Gypsy picking
Hybrid picking
Crosspicking
Downpicking
Flatpicking
Pick slide
Pick tapping

Finger picking (multiple picking)
Apoyando: rest stroke
Chicken picking
Fingerstyle guitar & fingerpicking (including Travis picking)
Pattern picking
Picados
Tirando: free stroke

Percussive techniques
Golpe: finger tapping (flamenco)
Tambour: string striking
Slapping: A variety of techniques

Head (Left) hand techniques
Double stop
Finger vibrato (includes string bending, and bending behind the nut)
Left-hand muting
Slide guitar
Lap slide guitar

Legato techniques
Hammer-on
Legato technique (includes rolls and trills)
Pull-off
Tapping

Harmonic techniques

Guitar harmonic
Artificial harmonic
Pinch harmonic
Tap harmonic

Extended techniques

Prepared guitar

History of guitars
History of the classical guitar

Guitar makers

Guitar manufacturers
 Luthier (Guitar maker)
 Bailey, John
 B.C. Rich Guitars
 Bourgeois Guitars
 Caparison Guitars
 Carvin A&I
 Collings Guitars
 Cort Guitars
 Dean Guitars
 Eastwood Guitars
 Epiphone Guitars
 ESP Guitars
 Fender Musical Instruments Corporation
 Fernandes Guitars
 Flipper's Guitar
 Gibson Guitar Corporation
 Godin guitars
 Gretsch
 Heritage Guitars
 Hagstrom
 Ibanez
 Jackson Guitars
 James Tyler Guitars
 John Bailey
 Kramer Guitars
 Kilometer
 Linda Manzer
 Maton Guitars
 Martin Guitars
 MusicMan
 Ovation Guitar Company
 Peavey Guitars
 Pensa Custom Guitars
 PRS Guitars
 Rickenbacker Guitars
 Schecter Guitar Research
 Takamine Guitars
 Taylor Guitars
 Valley Arts Guitar
 Warwick (bass guitar)
 Washburn guitars
 Yamaha
 Zon guitars

Guitar magazines
 Acoustic
 Acoustic Guitar
 Classical Guitar
 Fretboard Journal
 Guitar Aficianado
 Guitar Player
 Guitar World
 Guitarist
 Premier Guitar
 Soundboard
 Total Guitar
 Vintage Guitar
 Young Guitar Magazine

Guitar music
List of compositions for guitar

Guitar festivals
Crossroads Guitar Festival
Darwin International Guitar Festival
Output festival

Guitar community
Golden Guitar Attraction in Australia

Significant guitarists

Guitarist
List of guitarists
List of jazz guitarists
List of classical guitarists

Guitar methodologies
Guitar Craft

See also
Outline of music

References

External links

Instruments In Depth: The Guitar An online feature from Bloomingdale School of Music (October, 2007)
Stalking the Oldest Six-String Guitar
Guitar physics
International Guitar Research Archive
The Guitar, Heilbrunn Timeline of Art History, The Metropolitan Museum of Art featuring many historic guitars from the Museum's collection

 

 
Outlines of culture and arts
Wikipedia outlines
Music-related lists